Kong Fanyu (born 6 June 1993) is a Chinese freestyle skier who competes internationally. She participated at the 2018 Winter Olympics and won a bronze medal in aerials, and at the 2022 Winter Olympics, in Women's aerials.

She competed at the 2021–22 FIS Freestyle Ski World Cup.

References

External links

1993 births
Living people
Chinese female freestyle skiers
Olympic freestyle skiers of China
Freestyle skiers at the 2018 Winter Olympics
Freestyle skiers at the 2022 Winter Olympics
Medalists at the 2018 Winter Olympics
Olympic bronze medalists for China
Olympic medalists in freestyle skiing
Sportspeople from Anshan
Skiers from Liaoning
21st-century Chinese women